The TransLink Mayors' Council is the "collective voice of Metro Vancouver residents on transit and transportation", a gathering of mayors of all 21 municipalities of the Metro Vancouver Regional District, as well as Electoral Area A and the Tsawwassen First Nation, to set priorities for public transportation in the region. The council meets monthly.

References 

Greater Vancouver
TransLink (British Columbia)